Marat Gafurov (Russian: Марат Гафуров; born November 21, 1984) is a Russian professional mixed martial artist. He currently competes in the Featherweight and Lightweight division for the ONE Championship. A professional MMA competitor since 2010, Gafurov previously competed for the M-1 Global. He is a former M-1 Global Featherweight Champion and ONE Featherweight World Champion.

Mixed martial arts career

Early career
Gafurov made his debut at Krasnodar Challenger Cup - Mix Fight 3 on June 4, 2010 against Shamil Gadzhiev. he won a fight by Submission in first round.

M-1 Global
Gafurov faced Vugar Bakhshiev for the inaugural M-1 Global Featherweight Championship at M-1 Challenge 35 on November 15, 2012 in Saint Petersburg, Russia. He won by a first round Submission.

ONE Championship
Gafurov made his ONE debut against Rob Lisita in the main event of ONE FC: Roar of the Tigers on October 17, 2014. He won by first-round submission.

Gafurov faced Ev Ting at ONE: Warrior's Quest on May 22, 2015. He defeated Ting via first-round submission.

ONE Featherweight World Champion
Gafurov received his first title shot when he faced Martin Nguyen for the interim ONE Featherweight World Championship at ONE: Odyssey of Champions on September 27, 2015. Gafurov would set the record for fastest submission in ONE Championship history at 41 seconds and won the interim title.

Gafurov would face Jadamba Narantungalag in a title unification bout at ONE: Dynasty of Champions (Beijing II) on November 21, 2015. Gafurov won by fourth-round submission via rear-naked choke to become the undisputed ONE Featherweight World Champion.

Championship and accomplishments
 ONE Championship
 ONE Featherweight World Championship (One time)
 Two successful defense
 M-1 Global
 M-1 Global Featherweight Championship (One time)
 Two successful defense

Mixed martial arts record

|-
| Win
| align=center| 19–4
| Ariel Sexton 
| TKO (punches)
| ONE 159
| 
| align=center| 3
| align=center| 4:15
| Kallang, Singapore
| 
|-
| Loss
| align=center| 18–4
| Ok Rae Yoon 
| Decision (unanimous)
| ONE on TNT 3
| 
| align=center| 3
| align=center| 5:00
| Kallang, Singapore
|
|-
| Win
| align=center| 18–3
| Lowen Tynanes 
| Decision (split)
| ONE: Collision Course
| 
| align=center| 3
| align=center| 5:00
| Kallang, Singapore
|
|-
| Loss
| align=center| 17–3
| Iuri Lapicus 
| Submission (rear-naked choke)
| ONE: Warrior's Code
| 
| align=center| 1
| align=center| 1:07
| Jakarta, Indonesia
| 
|-
| Win
| align=center| 17–2
| Tetsuya Yamada 
| Decision (unanimous)
| ONE: For Honor
| 
| align=center| 3
| align=center| 5:00
| Jakarta, Indonesia 
|
|-
| Loss
| align=center| 16–2
| Koyomi Matsushima
| TKO (knees and punches)
| ONE: Conquest of Heroes
| 
| align=center| 1
| align=center| 2:41
| Jakarta, Indonesia 
|
|-
| Win
| align=center| 16–1
| Emilio Urrutia 
| Technical Submission (arm-triangle choke)
| ONE: Heroes of Honor
| 
| align=center| 1
| align=center| 2:34
| Pasay, Philippines 
| 
|-
| Loss
| align=center| 15–1
| Martin Nguyen 
| KO (punch)
| ONE: Quest for Greatness
| 
| align=center| 2
| align=center| 1:27
| Kuala Lumpur, Malaysia
|  
|-
| Win
| align=center| 15–0
| Jadamba Narantungalag
| Technical Submission (rear-naked choke)
| ONE: Defending Honor
| 
| align=center| 1
| align=center| 4:51
| Kallang, Singapore 
|  
|-
| Win
| align=center| 14–0
| Kazunori Yokota
| Submission (rear-naked choke)
| ONE: Kingdom of Champions
| 
| align=center| 2
| align=center| 4:25
| Bangkok, Thailand 
|  
|-
| Win
| align=center| 13–0
| Jadamba Narantungalag
| Technical Submission (rear-naked choke)
| ONE: Dynasty of Champions (Beijing II)
| 
| align=center| 4
| align=center| 4:39
| Beijing, China
|  
|-
| Win
| align=center| 12–0
| Martin Nguyen
| Submission (rear-naked choke)
| ONE: Odyssey of Champions
| 
| align=center| 1
| align=center| 0:41
| Jakarta, Indonesia 
|  
|-
| Win
| align=center| 11–0
| Ev Ting
| TKO (punches)
| ONE: Warrior's Quest
| 
| align=center| 1
| align=center| 4:30
| Kallang, Singapore 
| 
|-
| Win
| align=center| 10–0
| Rob Lisita
| Submission (rear-naked choke)
| ONE FC: Roar of the Tigers
| 
| align=center| 1
| align=center| 1:08
| Kuala Lumpur, Malaysia 
| 
|-
| Win
| align=center| 9–0
| Lee Morrison
| Decision (unanimous)
| M-1 Challenge 47
| 
| align=center| 5
| align=center| 5:00
| Findon, Australia
| 
|-
| Win
| align=center| 8–0
| Yuri Ivlev
| TKO (punches)
| M-1 Challenge 41
| 
| align=center| 2
| align=center| 3:56
| Saint Petersburg, Russia 
| 
|-
| Win
| align=center| 7–0
| Vugar Bakhshiev
| Submission (rear-naked choke)
| M-1 Challenge 35
| 
| align=center| 1
| align=center| 4:18
| Saint Petersburg, Russia
| 
|-
| Win
| align=center| 6–0
| Joakhim Tapi
| Submission (triangle choke)
| Pride of Caucasus 2012
| 
| align=center| 1
| align=center| 2:22
| Khasavyurt, Russia
| 
|-
| Win
| align=center| 5–0
| Mairbek Taisumov
| Decision (split)
| M-1: Battle of The Legends 2
| 
| align=center| 3
| align=center| 5:00
| Saint Petersburg, Russia
| 
|-
| Win
| align=center| 4–0
| David Kozma
| Submission (rear-naked choke)
| M-1 Challenge 31
| 
| align=center| 2
| align=center| 2:10
| Saint Petersburg, Russia
| 
|-
| Win
| align=center| 3–0
| Sheikh-Magomed Arapkhanov
| Decision (unanimous)
| M-1 Challenge 29
| 
| align=center| 3
| align=center| 5:00
| Ufa, Russia 
| 
|-
| Win
| align=center| 2–0
| Yuri Vlasenko
| Submission (rear-naked choke)
| M-1: Ukrainian Selection 2010 (Stage 6)
| 
| align=center| 1
| align=center| 1:18
| Kyiv, Ukraine 
| 
|-
| Win
| align=center| 1–0
| Shamil Gadzhiev
| Submission (armbar)
| Krasnodar Challenger 3
| 
| align=center| 1
| align=center| 3:10
| Krasnodar, Russia
| 
|-

See also
List of current ONE fighters

Notes

References

External links
 

1988 births
Russian people of Dagestani descent
Dagestani mixed martial artists
Featherweight mixed martial artists
Lightweight mixed martial artists
Welterweight mixed martial artists
Mixed martial artists utilizing Brazilian jiu-jitsu
Living people
People from Buynaksky District
Russian male mixed martial artists
Russian practitioners of Brazilian jiu-jitsu
People awarded a black belt in Brazilian jiu-jitsu
Sportspeople from Makhachkala
ONE Championship champions